Larkinella soli is a Gram-negative, rod-shaped, aerobic and motile bacterium from the genus of Larkinella which has been isolated from biological soil crusts from Erdos Plateau in the Mongolia.

References

External links
Type strain of Larkinella soli at BacDive -  the Bacterial Diversity Metadatabase

Cytophagia
Bacteria described in 2017